Eerikki is a Finnish masculine given name. It is a cognate of the name Eric.

Individuals bearing the name Eerikki include;
Eerikki Koivu (born 1979), ice hockey player
Eerikki Tuurenpoika (fl. 15th-century; also known as Eric Bielke and Eric Tureson), royal councillor of Sweden, knight and feudal fiefholder
Eerikki Viljanen (born 1975), politician

References

Masculine given names
Finnish masculine given names